Edward Cecil (1572–1638), English military and naval commander.

Edward Cecil may also refer to:

 Lord Edward Cecil (1867–1918), British soldier and colonial administrator 
Edward Cecil, Viscount Cranborne from Page of Honour
Edward Cecil (actor) (1878–1940), American film actor

See also